Jeet Hamaari is a 1983 Indian Hindi-language film directed by R. Thyagarajan and written by Ram Govind, starring Rajinikanth, Rakesh Roshan, Ranjeeta and Anita Raj. It was simultaneously shot in Tamil as Thai Veedu, with Rajinikanth, Anita Raj and Silk Smitha reprising their roles from the original Tamil version. The film was released on 30 May 1983.

Plot 
Thakur Vikram Singh (Om Shivpuri) is informed by a museum curator that an ancestral sword donated by his father has been stolen. This is important because it bore half the location of a hidden treasure. The other half is on a sword still in Singh's possession, and he must guard it. He finds a thief, Avtar Singh (Madan Puri) attempting to steal the sword and stops him. Avtar grabs Thakur's son, Mohan and escapes. He is to exchange sword for son at the black hills, but his car is stolen by a thief, who raises Mohan as his own under the name Raju. Raju (Rajinikanth) grows up to be a car thief, and eventually encounters his family as his enemies.

Cast 
Rajinikanth as Mohan / Raju
Rakesh Roshan as Anand
Ranjeeta as Geeta
Anita Raj as Anita
Shakti Kapoor as Vijay
Madan Puri as Avtar Singh
Om Shivpuri as Thakur Vikram Singh
Padma Chavan as Thakurain Nirmala Singh
Silk Smitha as Soni
Satyen Kappu as Raju's Father
Jagdish Raj as Police Commissioner Saxena
Gurbachan Singh as Inspector Musibat Singh

Music
Indeevar penned every song except "Aanewala Aaya Hai" (Maya Govind)

References

External links 

1983 films
1980s Hindi-language films
Films scored by Bappi Lahiri
Films directed by R. Thyagarajan (director)